Dominique Bosshart (born October 7, 1977) is a Canadian taekwondo athlete.

She was Canada's only taekwondo competitor during the 2000 Summer Olympics in Sydney, where she won a bronze medal in the heavyweight division (+ 67 kg). She competed in the 2004 Summer Olympics in Athens but did not medal.

Bosshart began studying taekwondo at age 13, at the urging of her brother. At age 15, she moved from living with her parents in Landmark, Manitoba to living on her own in Winnipeg in order to train with Master Joo Kang at Kang's Taekwondo Academy.

References

External links
 Athlete bio on CBC.ca

1977 births
Living people
People from Morges
Swiss emigrants to Canada
Canadian people of Swiss descent
Canadian female taekwondo practitioners
Naturalized citizens of Canada
Olympic bronze medalists for Canada
Olympic taekwondo practitioners of Canada
Sportspeople from Winnipeg
Taekwondo practitioners at the 2000 Summer Olympics
Taekwondo practitioners at the 2004 Summer Olympics
Olympic medalists in taekwondo
Medalists at the 2000 Summer Olympics
Pan American Games bronze medalists for Canada
Pan American Games medalists in taekwondo
Taekwondo practitioners at the 1995 Pan American Games
Taekwondo practitioners at the 1999 Pan American Games
World Taekwondo Championships medalists
Medalists at the 1995 Pan American Games
Medalists at the 1999 Pan American Games